Saba Raleigh was the pseudonym of Isabel Pauline Rowlands, née Ellissen (8 August 1862 – 22 August 1923), an English actress. On 31 March 1894 she became the second wife of Abraham Cecil Francis Fothergill Rowlands, the actor and playwright Cecil Raleigh, and was often billed as "Mrs. Cecil Raleigh".

Selected filmography
 The Two Orphans (1915) billed as Mrs. Cecil Raleigh
 The Clemenceau Case (1915) billed as Mrs. Cecil Raleigh
 Profit and the Loss (1917)
 Desire (1920)
 The Temptress (1920)
 The Princess of New York (1921)
 Love Maggy (1921)

References

External links

1862 births
1923 deaths
English stage actresses
English film actresses
English silent film actresses
20th-century English actresses